Garden Ruin is the fifth studio album by the rock band Calexico. It was released in 2006 on Quarterstick Records. The LP is the first Calexico album to feature no instrumental tracks, instead relying on a more direct, pop-style approach. Forgoing what has been described as "indie-mariachi", the band took their music in a different direction, and the result is a more straightforward indie rock album.

As of 2009 it has sold 46,000 copies in US.

Track listing

Musicians
 John Convertino – Drums (1-11), Percussion (6), Shakers (10)
 Joey Burns – Acoustic Guitar (1-11), Electric Guitar (1,3-9,11), Vocals (1-11), Piano (1,8,11), Tambourine (1,3,4), Cello (2), Banjo (3), Wurlitzer (3,7,8), Casio Flute (4), Glockenspiel (4), Shaker (4), Bass (5,9), Backup Vocals (5), Vibes (6), Bass Melodica (7), Organ (9), Accordion (10)
 Volker Zander – Electric Bass (1,3,6-8,10), Vibes (9)
 Martin Wenk – Glockenspiel (1), Trumpet (1,3,6), Wurlitzer (3), Nashville Tuning Guitar (3), Electric Guitar (9,11), Banjo (10), Noise (11)
 Jacob Valenzuela – Trumpet (1,3,6)
 JD Foster – Nashville Tuning Guitar (1,3), Horn Arrangement (1,6), Electric Guitar (1), Banjo Ukulele (3), Mando Bird (3), Electric Bass (4,11), Sleigh Bells (4), Backup Vocals (5), Fender Rhodes Bass (11)
 Rob Burger – Hammond B3 Organ (1)
 Paul Niehaus – Pedal Steel (1,8), Electric Guitar (1,7,9-11), Baritone Guitar (6)
 Nelzimar Neves – Cello (3)
 Dan Coleman – Cello Arrangement (3)
 Naim Amor – Electric Guitar (5)
 Jelle Kuiper – Shakers (6), Thunder Drum (10)
 Nick Luca – Hammond B3 Organ (6), Electric Jazz Guitar (7), Reverse Wurlitzer (11)
 Eldys Isak Vega – Piano (6)
 Roberto Mendoza – Sound Effects (6)
 Amparo Sanchez – Vocals (6)

Charts

References

External links
 

2006 albums
Calexico (band) albums
Quarterstick Records albums